Prince Ning of the Second Rank, or simply Prince Ning, was the title of a princely peerage used in China during the Manchu-led Qing dynasty (1644–1912). As the Prince Ning peerage was not awarded "iron-cap" status, this meant that each successive bearer of the title would normally start off with a title downgraded by one rank vis-à-vis that held by his predecessor. However, the title would generally not be downgraded to any lower than a feng'en fuguo gong except under special circumstances.

The first bearer of the title was Hongjiao (弘晈; 1713–1764), the fourth son of Yinxiang and a grandson of the Kangxi Emperor. In 1730, Hongjiao was granted the title "Prince Ning of the Second Rank" by the Yongzheng Emperor. The title was passed down over six generations and held by eight persons.

Members of the Prince Ning peerage

 Hongjiao (弘晈; 1713–1764), Yinxiang's fourth son, held the title Prince Ning of the Second Rank from 1730 to 1764, posthumously honoured as Prince Ningliang of the Second Rank (寧良郡王)
 Yongfu (永福; 1753–1782), Hongjiao's second son, held the title of a beile from 1764 to 1782, posthumously honoured as Gongke Beile (恭恪貝勒) in 1782, posthumously promoted to "Prince Yi of the First Rank" in 1864
 Mianyu (綿譽; 1780–1844), Yongfu's fourth son, held the title of a beile from 1782 to 1844, posthumously promoted to "Prince Yi of the First Rank" in 1864
 Yiqu (奕蘧), Mianyu's eldest son, held the title of a second class zhenguo jiangjun from 1821 to 1839, stripped of his title in 1839
 Yige (奕格; 1805–1858), Mianyu's third son, held the title of a beizi from 1844 to 1858, posthumously promoted to "Prince Yi of the First Rank" in 1864
 Zaidun (載敦; 1827–1890), Yige's second son, held the title of a third class zhenguo jiangjun from 1857 to 1858, promoted to feng'en zhenguo gong in 1858, inherited the Prince Yi peerage in 1864 and became "Prince Yi of the First Rank", posthumously honoured as "Prince Yiduan of the First Rank" (怡端親王)
 Zaixi (載熙), Yige's seventh son, held the title of a zhenguo jiangjun from 1857 to 1875
 Purong (溥榮), Zaixi's eldest son, held the title of a fuguo jiangjun from 1856 to 1894, had no male heir
 Yilian (奕連), Mianyu's fourth son, held the title of a feng'en jiangjun from 1833 to 1849, had no male heir
 Yiwu (奕珷), Mianyu's sixth son, held the title of a first class fuguo jiangjun from 1836 to 1883
 Zaikong (載孔), Yiwu's second son, held the title of a fengguo jiangjun from 1883 to 1901
 Pukai (溥凱), Zaikong's eldest son, held the title of a feng'en jiangjun from 1902
 Pucai (溥彩), Zaikong's second son, held the title of a feng'en jiangjun from 1897
 Yicun (奕存), Mianyu's eighth son, held the title of a feng'en jiangjun from 1862 to 1876
 Zaishou (載壽), Yicun's eldest son, held the title of a feng'en jiangjun from 1876 to 1890
 Zaitai (載泰; 1838–1878), Yizeng's second son and Zaidun's successor, held the title of a buru bafen fuguo gong from 1862 to 1864, promoted to feng'en fuguo gong in 1864, stripped of his title in 1866
 Zaibo (載帛; 1853–1913), Yixie's eldest son and Zaitai's successor, held the title of a feng'en fuguo gong from 1866 to 1913
 Pulin (溥琳; 1882–1937), Zaibo's eldest son, held the title of a feng'en fuguo gong from 1913 to 1937

Family tree

See also
 Prince Yi (怡)
 Royal and noble ranks of the Qing dynasty

References
 

Qing dynasty princely peerages